Leptolalax pelodytoides (Thao Asian toad, Karin metacarpal-tubercled toad, and many other common names) is a frog species in the family Megophryidae. It is known with reasonable certainty only from near its type locality, the Karen Hills region in the Kayah State, eastern Myanmar. As Leptolalax pelodytoides was one of the first megophryid species to be described from the region, later research has shown that many specimens that have been reported as L. pelodytoides represent other species, including Leptolalax bourreti, Leptolalax oshanensis, Leptolalax eos, and Leptolalax minimus. A consequence is that the most recent IUCN assessment (from 2004) reports much broader distribution for this species than what can be ascertained.

Description
Leptolalax pelodytoides is a large-sized Leptolalax: males measure  and females  in snout-vent length. Their back is brown with indistinct darker outline on warts and foldings and sides are with large dark
blackish spots.

References

pelodytoides
Amphibians of Myanmar
Amphibians described in 1893
Taxonomy articles created by Polbot
Taxobox binomials not recognized by IUCN